The Catholic Church in the Czech Republic, joint in the national Czech Episcopal Conference, comprises :
 a Latin hierarchy, consisting of two ecclesiastical provinces, each headed by a Metropolitan Archbishopric, with a total of six  suffragan dioceses
 an Eastern Catholic (Byzantine Catholic) Apostolic Exarchate, covering the whole Czech Republic.

There are no other exempt Latin jurisdictions.

There is an Apostolic Nunciature to the Czech Republic as papal diplomatic representation (embassy-level).

Current Latin dioceses

Ecclesiastical Province of Bohemia (Prague) 
 Metropolitan Roman Catholic Archdiocese of Prague
 Roman Catholic Diocese of České Budějovice
 Roman Catholic Diocese of Hradec Králové
 Roman Catholic Diocese of Litoměřice
 Roman Catholic Diocese of Plzeň

Ecclesiastical Province of Moravia and Czech Silesia (Olomouc) 
 Metropolitan Roman Catholic Archdiocese of Olomouc
 Roman Catholic Diocese of Brno
 Roman Catholic Diocese of Ostrava-Opava

Current Eastern Catholic jurisdiction 
exempt, i.e. directly dependent on the Holy See

Ruthenian Catholic Church 
Byzantine Rite
 Apostolic Exarchate in the Czech Republic

Defunct jurisdictions 
All Latin

Titular See 
One Episcopal titular bishopric : Diocese of Litomyšl

Other 
 Apostolic Administration of Český Těšín (merged into Metropolitan Archdiocese of Olomouc)

See also 
 List of Catholic dioceses (structured view)

Sources and external links 
 GCatholic.org - data for all sections.
 Catholic-Hierarchy entry.

Czech Republic
Catholic dioceses